Live Phish 04.05.98 is the final night of the four-night "Island Tour", recorded live at the Providence Civic Center in Providence, Rhode Island, on April 5, 1998.

The short mini-run quickly became one of the most popular Phish performances of all time, with the band mixing the funk of 1997 with the high-energy jams of the mid-1990s along with brand new compositions.

Highlights include a 16-minute "Down with Disease", as well as a funky second set that features a slow, funked out version of "Cavern" that evolves out of a jam developed in "Possum". Additionally, "Shafty" made its concert debut this night. The band expands on "Cavern" well into the 13-minute mark, a song that is usually about four minutes long in concert.

This would be the last Phish concert until their return to Europe in July.

In addition to being a CD release, this concert is available as a download in FLAC and MP3 formats at LivePhish.com.

Track listing

Disc one

Set one:
 "The Oh Kee Pa Ceremony" (Anastasio) – 2:23 →
 "You Enjoy Myself" (Anastasio) – 25:53
 "Theme from the Bottom" (Anastasio, Fishman, Gordon, Marshall, McConnell) – 10:35 →
 "McGrupp and the Watchful Hosemasters" (Anastasio, Marshall) - 10:28 →

Disc two

Set one, continued:
 "Bathtub Gin" (Anastasio, Goodman) – 11:25 →
 "Cities" (Byrne) – 10:36 →
 "Sparkle" (Anastasio, Marshall) – 4:25 →
 "Split Open and Melt" (Anastasio) – 11:58
Set two:
 "Down with Disease" (Anastasio, Marshall) – 16:30

Disc three

Set two, continued:
 "Ya Mar" (Ferguson) – 14:19 →
 "Prince Caspian" (Anastasio, Marshall) – 11:20 →
 "Maze" (Anastasio, Marshall) – 8:05 →
 "Shafty" (Anastasio, Fishman, Gordon, Marshall, McConnell) – 5:04 →
 "Possum" (Holdsworth) – 8:23 →
 "Cavern" (Anastasio, Herman, Marshall) – 12:57
Encore:
 "Bold as Love" (Hendrix) – 6:41

Personnel

Trey Anastasio – guitars, lead vocals
Page McConnell – piano, organ, backing vocals, lead vocals on "Bold as Love"
Mike Gordon – bass, backing vocals, lead vocals on "Ya Mar"
Jon Fishman – drums, backing vocals

References

27
1998.04.05
2005 live albums
Elektra Records live albums